Sean Stuart Cairncross (born July 12, 1974) was the Chief Executive Officer of the Millennium Challenge Corporation from 2019 to 2021, and a former senior adviser to U.S. President Donald Trump.

References

External links
Biography at Millennium Challenge Corporation
Washington Post
CNN

1974 births
Living people
American University alumni
Alumni of the University of Cambridge
New York University School of Law alumni
Trump administration personnel